The 2024 South Carolina Republican presidential primary will be held on February 24, 2024, as part of the Republican Party primaries for the 2024 presidential election. 50 delegates to the 2024 Republican National Convention will be allocated on a selection basis. 

Held following the Iowa caucuses and the New Hampshire primary, the South Carolina primary will be the third in the cycle, and will be held on the same day as the Nevada caucuses. South Carolina holds the "first in the South" presidential primary for both major parties. 

Nikki Haley, who served as Governor of South Carolina from 2011 to 2017, has announced her presidential candidacy. Tim Scott, who has represented South Carolina in the U.S. Senate since 2013, is also considering a candidacy.

Background 
The Republican electorate in South Carolina is noted for having a high proportion of Evangelical voters. Socially conservative candidates have performed well in the South Carolina primary in past contests. In the 2012 Republican primary, Newt Gingrich beat out eventual nominee Mitt Romney in the state with support from evangelical voters. 

In the 2016 South Carolina Republican primary, Donald Trump won with 32.51% of the vote, with nearest opponent Marco Rubio taking 22.48%. Trump reportedly won 34% of the Evangelical vote in the primary, with Ted Cruz taking 26%, and Rubio taking 21%.

Candidates 

As of March 2, 2023, there are two major contenders in the Republican presidential primary: former President Donald Trump and former Governor of South Carolina and Ambassador to the United Nations Nikki Haley. Florida governor Ron DeSantis is widely expected to announce his candidacy as soon as May 2023. 

Tim Scott, who represents South Carolina in the United States Senate, is considered a potential contender for the Republican presidential nomination. Commentators have noted that candidate Haley and potential contender Scott's "favorite son" status in the state could put their candidacies on a "potential collision course".

Endorsements

Polling

See also 
 2024 Republican Party presidential primaries
 2024 United States presidential election
 2024 United States presidential election in South Carolina
 2024 United States elections

Notes

References 

South Carolina Republican primaries
Republican presidential primary
South Carolina